The Remsen Stakes is an American Grade II race for Thoroughbred horse race run annually near the end of November at Aqueduct Racetrack in Queens, New York. The one and one-eighths mile race is open to two-year-olds and currently offers a purse of $250,000.

Inaugurated in 1904, the Remsen was named for Colonel Joremus Remsen (1735–1790) whose family at one time owned a large portion of Long Island and who became leader of the American Revolutionary forces at the 1776 Battle of Long Island.

Run at Jamaica Race Course from inception in 1904 to 1959, it was run in two divisions in 1943 and until 1954 was known as the Remsen Handicap. There was no race held in 1908, and none from 1910 to 1917 as well as 1951.

The Remsen stakes is influential as one of the last graded stakes for two-year-olds on the New York racing circuit and its winner is generally among the winterbook favorites for the following year's Kentucky Derby.

Records
 1:47 4/5 – Believe It (1977) (at current  miles distance)
 1:33 4/5 – Sum Up (1964) (at 1 mile, it was the fastest time ever run by a 2-year-old)

Most wins by a jockey:
 4 – Eddie Maple (1972, 1977, 1981, 1989)
 4 – John R. Velazquez (2001, 2005, 2010, 2016)

Most wins by a trainer:
 4 – Claude R. McGaughey III (1988, 1997, 2001, 2013)

Most wins by an owner:
 2 – Belair Stud (1938, 1941)
 2 – Brookmeade Stable (1940, 1944)
 2 – Maine Chance Farm (1944, 1945)
 2 – Allen T. Simmons (1943, 1948)
 2 – Windfields Farm (1959, 1963)
 2 – Rokeby Stable (1971, 1986)
 2 – Fox Hill Farms, Inc. (2004, 2008)
 2 – WinStar Farm (2005, 2007)

Winners

 1984 – Stone White finished first, but was disqualified from purse money.
 1980 – Akureyri finished first, but was disqualified and placed third.
 1952 – Jamie K finished first, but was disqualified.
 1940, 1944 – Dead heat for the win.

References

See also
Road to the Kentucky Derby

Horse races in New York City
Aqueduct Racetrack
Flat horse races for two-year-olds
Graded stakes races in the United States
Recurring sporting events established in 1904
Jamaica Race Course
1904 establishments in New York City